Spirit of Kingston is a , 149 passenger passenger-only ferry owned and operated as part of the King County Water Taxi fleet.

History
Spirit of Kingston was built by All American Marine in Bellingham, Washington in 2004 and launched in January 2005.  She was formerly in use in Alaska under the name Spirit as a ferry between Skagway and Haines and for eco-tourism.  In early 2010 she was acquired by the Port of Kingston for their SoundRunner service via a $3.5 million Federal Transit Administration grant. She sailed between Downtown Seattle and Kingston until the service was discontinued in the fall of 2012.

On March 18, 2013, Spirit of Kingston was acquired by the King County Ferry District at no cost under an arrangement with the Federal Transit Administration, which had originally provided the grant funding to the Port of Kingston for its acquisition.  Service was projected to begin in the late spring of 2013.

Two months after her acquisition by the KCFD, the Spirit of Kingston entered service on the West Seattle/Downtown Seattle route.

In January 2016, the Spirit of Kingston was replaced by the Doc Maynard. The Spirit of Kingston now serves as the backup vessel on the West Seattle/Downtown Seattle route, when the Doc Maynard or the Sally Fox goes out of service.

Technical information
Spirit of Kingston has a catamaran hull and has waterjet propulsion for a cruise speed of 28 knots and maximum speed of 42.5 knots.

References

Ferries of Washington (state)
Transportation in Kitsap County, Washington
2004 ships
Water transport in Seattle